Daniel Pyne is an American writer and producer. He has written novels as well as film scripts.

Select filmography
Matt Houston (1984–85) - writer of various episodes
Miami Vice (1985) - writer of various episodes
Pacific Heights (1990)
The Antagonists (1991) - writer of various episodes
Doc Hollywood (1991)
The Hard Way (1991)
White Sands (1992)
Where's Marlowe? (1998) - also directed
Any Given Sunday (1999)
Fracture (2007)
Backstabbing for Beginners (2018)

References

External links
Personal website
 

American screenwriters
Living people
Year of birth missing (living people)